Kelly Jean Killoren Bensimon (born May 1, 1968) is an American real estate agent, author, the Editor of Elle Accessories, and a former model. She appeared as a full-time cast member on the Bravo television series The Real Housewives of New York City from seasons 2 to season 4.

Early life
Kelly Jean Killoren was born in Rockford, Illinois. She began working as a model while in her teens.

Education
Kelly graduated from Keith Country Day School, a college prep academy in Rockford, Illinois before attending college. She attended Trinity College, Connecticut, but left after a year. She graduated in 1998 from Columbia's School of General Studies for non-traditional students, with a degree in Literature and Writing. She completed an MBA with a focus on International Marketing at Northeastern University in 2015.

Career
As a model, she appeared in magazines such as Elle, Cosmopolitan, and Harper's Bazaar, and she was once the face of Clarins. She appeared on the cover and in a six-page pictorial in the March 2010 edition of Playboy, which was photographed by her ex-husband Gilles Bensimon. In September 2011, Killoren Bensimon was on the cover of Shape and was featured in a pictorial based on her exercise routine.

She has worked as a host of various events including IMG fashion week, and of the IMG swim shows in Miami. She was a spokesperson in 2006 for Wool as part of their Test Marketing Productions (TMP);.  Bensimon hosted and modeled in menswear events with GQ magazine. She was also an "ambassador" for Spring 2007 Mercedes-Benz Fashion Week in New York City.

Killoren Bensimon has had several jewelry collections. Her first line of jewelry was sold exclusively at Barneys New York. Her second line of jewelry was sold at Bloomingdale's in fall 2007. On June 24, 2010, Killoren Bensimon announced the launch of her fourth jewelry collection, Kelly by Kelly Killoren Bensimon. The collection included mixed metals, leather, feathers and crystals and was sold at Intermix stores across the U.S. to support Feeding America. For spring 2011, Bensimon's jewelry collection was sold at Wink, W Hotels, and Dash. She also sold a jewelry collection on HSN. In 2013, she launched a fragrance, In the Spirit of, and a candle line called Baiser Rose. In 2019, she launched an outerwear line called Enville by Pologeorgis.

Her television career most notably includes Bravo's The Real Housewives of New York City (seasons 2-4), which she joined in 2009 as a full cast member. She experienced a controversial onscreen nervous breakdown while on a cast trip to the island of Saint John, U.S. Virgin Islands. Killoren Bensimon appeared on Bravo's Odd Mom Out in episodes 9 and 10 of season 2. She also appeared on WEtv's reality series Million Dollar Matchmaker.

Killoren Bensimon has also worked as a writer, producing three books for Assouline Publishing: In the Spirit of the Hamptons (2 volumes), American Style, and The Bikini Book. A portion of the author's proceeds were donated to the Costume Institute of the Metropolitan Museum of Art. Her fourth book, I Can Make You Hot, was published by St. Martin's Press in April 2012. A portion of the author's proceeds were donated to Generositywater.org. In June 2016, Simon & Schuster published Bensimon's novel, A Dangerous Age.  In August 2017, Killoren launched the sequel The Second Course, an odyssey about the food world. Bensimon also wrote a column in Page Six Magazine called "The Socializer: Kelly Bensimon".  She is a style columnist for the newspaper AM New York. She is the editor at large for Hamptons Magazine, a free weekly with circulation of 40,000 to 50,000 and Gotham Magazine. Both publications are owned by Niche Media. She became the founding editor of Elle Accessories, but left after two issues.

After obtaining her real estate agent's license, Killoren joined Dolly Lenz Realty in New York in 2018. She moved to the Douglas Elliman real estate group in 2019. She has also made numerous appearances on Million Dollar Listing New York.

Personal life
Killoren Bensimon was married to fashion photographer Gilles Bensimon until the couple divorced in 2007. They have two daughters, Sea Louise, born in 1998, and Thaddeus Ann, born in 2000. In August 2017, ten years after her divorce, Killoren Bensimon explained in a video that she would be dropping her ex-husband's last name, and would again be using the name Kelly Killoren.

On March 5, 2009, Killoren Bensimon was arrested on allegations of domestic violence and assault against her ex-boyfriend. Her ex-boyfriend alleged that she punched him in the face during an argument. Killoren Bensimon entered into a plea agreement with the State of New York, under which she was required to perform two days of community service.

Killoren Bensimon is Catholic.

References

External links

1968 births
Female models from Illinois
Columbia University School of General Studies alumni
Living people
Writers from Rockford, Illinois
Trinity College (Connecticut) alumni
The Real Housewives cast members
21st-century American novelists
American real estate brokers
American women in business
American women novelists
Businesspeople from Illinois
Businesspeople from New York City
Catholics from Illinois
Catholics from New York (state)
21st-century American women writers